Issans is a commune in the Doubs department in the Bourgogne-Franche-Comté region in eastern France.

Geography
The village is situated in the small valley of the Rupt  from Montbéliard.

Population

Economy
The village has retained its rural character, but also has become the home of several artisans and commercial establishments.

See also
 Communes of the Doubs department

References

External links

Issans on the intercommunal Web site of the department 

Communes of Doubs
County of Montbéliard